Proctor Lake is a U.S. Army Corps of Engineers reservoir along the Leon River located in Comanche County in the U.S. state of Texas, around 3 miles (5 km) west of Proctor, Texas. Proctor Lake Dam and the reservoir are managed by the Fort Worth District of the U.S. Army Corps of Engineers. The reservoir was officially impounded in 1963, and serves to provide flood control and drinking water for the communities downstream. Proctor Lake is a popular recreational destination.

Fish populations
Proctor Lake has been stocked with species of fish intended to improve the utility of the reservoir for recreational fishing, including largemouth bass, hybrid striped bass, catfish, and white crappie.

Recreational uses
In addition to maintaining the dam that creates the reservoir, the U.S. Army Corps of Engineers maintains recreational facilities at the lake, including Copperas Creek Park, Sowell Creek Park, Promontory Park, and High Point Park. High Point Park camping has been closed for many years, but hiking and equestrian trails are open .Camping, boating, and fishing are very popular.

External links
U.S. Army Corps of Engineers: Official Proctor Lake web site
U.S. Army Corps of Engineers: Corps Lake Getaway
Proctor Lake – Texas Parks & Wildlife
 

Reservoirs in Texas
Protected areas of Comanche County, Texas
Bodies of water of Comanche County, Texas